Bonnie Lowenthal (born February 19, 1940) is an American politician who represented California's 70th State Assembly district. Lowenthal also served on the Long Beach City Council prior to her service in the Assembly.  Lowenthal unsuccessfully ran for Mayor of Long Beach in 2014, failing to get past the primary nominating election, earning 19% of the vote.

Early life
Bonnie Lowenthal is the daughter of Jewish immigrants from the Soviet Union who immigrated to the United States to escape increasing anti-Semitism.

Legislative accomplishments
Lowenthal has authored several bills that have been signed and adopted into law since arriving in the Assembly. Most notable are her bills that deal with job creation, government reform, health, public safety and the environment. Specific bills signed into law include AB 361: Workers Compensation Preauthorization Denials, which prohibits an insurance company that provides workers’ compensation coverage from rescinding or modifying and authorization for medical services after the services are rendered. This bill states that if a company tells a doctor to provide services, then it has to pay for those services; AB 2098 (Miller/Lowenthal): Riverside County Transportation Commission, which clears away legal hurdles to a design-build improvement project on the Riverside (91) Freeway. The project, funded entirely without state general fund money, promises 18,000 jobs throughout the region; AB 1749: Whistleblower Protection; which gives employees of the Judicial Branch of the State the same level of protection against retaliation for reporting wrongdoing as is currently afforded to other employees of the state bureaucracy; AB 2199: Repeal of Discriminatory Language, which strikes out a provision in the California Welfare and Institutions code that requires mental health officials to find the “causes and cures of homosexuality.” That law was written in 1950 and AB 2199 strips that discriminatory language from the books; AB 2435: MFT Elder Abuse Training, recognizes that  Mental health care providers are key to stopping elder and dependent adult abuse and helping families in crisis. This bill requires MFTs, psychologists, LCSWs, and Licensed Professional Clinical Counselors to have training in the recognition and reporting of suspected elder and dependent adult abuse.

Current Legislation

Lowenthal's current legislation is a mix containing transportation, health and government reform bills including; AB 312: Violence Against the Homeless, which recognizes that Violence against the homeless has substantially risen over the past decade. This bill would specify that a homeless person has the civil right to be free from violence or intimidation, and, most importantly, it would state that if they are attacked simply for being homeless, they would be able to sue their aggressor for enhanced civil damages. It would shift the cost of protecting the homeless onto the backs of those who would seek to harm them; AB 739: Mental Health Curriculum, which would require the State Board of Education to include suicide prevention instruction as part of health education for grades 7 through 12; AB 960: Electronic waste, which would require electronic waste recyclers to take other electronic waste and devices in addition to the covered products.

Pre Assembly political career
Prior to her service in the Assembly, Lowenthal was elected to represent the First Council District of the City of Long Beach, in 2001, and was selected to serve as Vice Mayor in 2006. Lowenthal also served on the Long Beach Unified School District Board of Education for seven years and was a member of the Los Angeles County Metropolitan Transportation Authority (MTA), as well as many community boards and committees.

Background
Assembly member Lowenthal received her Bachelor of Science degree from the University of Wisconsin (class of 1961) and a Master's of Science in Community and Clinical Psychology from Cal State Long Beach (class of 1974). Since 1975, Lowenthal has been a licensed family counselor and mental health consultant. She has also served as a bilingual mental health consultant for the League of United Latin American Citizens (LULAC), HeadStart, and the Centro de la Raza,

Personal life
Assembly member Lowenthal was previously married to California State Senator Alan Lowenthal—who was also one of her predecessors in her current Assembly seat. They were the first divorced couple to serve concurrently in the legislature. They have two sons. Daniel, is a judge on a Superior Court, and Josh is a member of the California State Assembly.

Notes

External links
Join California Bonnie Lowenthal

California city council members
Democratic Party members of the California State Assembly
Women state legislators in California
1940 births
Living people
American clinical psychologists
Educators from Greater Los Angeles
Family therapists
Women city councillors in California
California State University, Long Beach alumni
University of Wisconsin–Madison alumni
Spouses of California politicians
20th-century American educators
21st-century American politicians
21st-century American women politicians
20th-century American women